Vera Koenen  (born 2 January 1967 in Alkmaar) was a Dutch female volleyball player.

She was part of the Netherlands women's national volleyball team at the 1992 Summer Olympics, and the 1994 FIVB Women's Volleyball World Championship. On club level she played with Martinus Amsterdam.

Martinus Amstelveen
AS Cannes
Avero Sneek
Dynamo Apeldoorn
ATC Hengelo

References

External links
 
 
 Team roster at CEV.lu
 

1967 births
Living people
Dutch women's volleyball players
Olympic volleyball players of the Netherlands
Volleyball players at the 1992 Summer Olympics
Sportspeople from Alkmaar